Them or Us is an album by American musician Frank Zappa, released in October 1984 by Barking Pumpkin Records.

Album content
Its opening and closing songs were not written by Zappa: "The Closer You Are", was written by Earl Lewis and Morgan Robinson and originally released by The Channels; and "Whippin' Post", originally performed by The Allman Brothers Band.

"Ya Hozna" includes backward vocals taken from "Sofa No. 2" (from One Size Fits All, 1975), "Lonely Little Girl" (from We're Only in It for the Money, 1968) and unreleased outtakes of "Valley Girl" (vocals by Moon Zappa).  "Planet of My Dreams" (featuring Bob Harris on vocals) is a 1981 studio recording taken from the score of Zappa's unrealized 1972 stage musical Hunchentoot (other titles from this show appear on the first-CD edition of the Sleep Dirt reissue from 1993). "Be In My Video", described as the best song on the album, pokes fun at the cliches in music videos, particularly David Bowie's hit single "Let's Dance".

As with other Zappa rock albums of this era, many of the tracks are sourced from live recordings. Later studio overdubs were liberally applied, although there is no mention of this on the album notes.

Release
Following problems with the album Thing-Fish, which MCA Records refused to distribute, Zappa made a deal with EMI Records, which would allow Them Or Us and Thing-Fish to be distributed by Capitol Records in the United States. Zappa wrote a "warning" which appeared on the inner sleeves of these albums, as well as Frank Zappa Meets the Mothers of Prevention, which stated that the albums contained content "which a truly free society would neither fear nor suppress", and a "guarantee" which stated that the lyrics would not "cause eternal torment in the place where the guy with the horns and pointed stick conducts his business."

Track listing
All tracks written by Frank Zappa, except where noted.

Personnel

Musicians
 Frank Zappa – guitar, vocals
 Ray White – guitar, vocals
 Steve Vai – guitar
 Dweezil Zappa – guitar
 Tommy Mars – keyboards
 Bobby Martin – keyboards, saxophone, vocals, harmonica
 George Duke – piano, vocals
 Brad Cole – piano
 Scott Thunes – bass, Minimoog
 Arthur Barrow – bass 
 Patrick O'Hearn – bass
 Ed Mann – percussion
 Chad Wackerman – drums
 Ike Willis – vocals
 Napoleon Murphy Brock – vocals
 Roy Estrada – vocals
 Johnny "Guitar" Watson – vocals
 Moon Unit Zappa – vocals
 Bob Harris – vocals
 Thana Harris – vocals

Production staff
Mark Pinske – chief engineer
John Matousek – mastering
Gabrielle Raumberger – artwork, graphic design
Steve Schapiro – photography
Bob Stone – engineer
Donald Roller Wilson - Cover art

References

External links
Release information

1984 albums
Albums produced by Frank Zappa
Barking Pumpkin Records albums
Frank Zappa albums